Saint Gerontius may refer to:

Gerontius of Cervia (died 501), Italian bishop who is venerated as a saint
Geraint, character from Welsh folklore and Arthurian legend, a king of Dumnonia and a valiant warrior